Ada College of Education is a teacher education college in Ada-Foah (Ada East District, Greater Accra, Ghana). The college is located in Eastern / Greater Accra zone. It is one of the 46 Public Colleges of Education. The college participated in the DFID-funded T-TEL programme.

The college has its accreditation from the University of Cape Coast.

Location 
Ada College of Education is located at Ada Foah in the Greater Accra Region of Ghana.

History 
The Ada College of Education was previously called Ada Teacher Training College. It was founded by Dr. Kwame Nkrumah in 1965.

Ada College of Education was founded with a vision to be a centre of excellence in the production of disciplined, resourceful and self motivated teachers always ready to offer services anywhere in Ghana. Its mission is to train teachers imbued with professional and academic competences and skills in general and technical education for basic schools in Ghana. The college has its motto as ‘ Awareness, Curiosity and Compassion . The first batch of students numbered 24 with Mr. J.M.T. Dosoo after whom the college Library has been named serving as the first principal and was supported by Messrs J.N. Dzeagu, E.A.K. Kuworno, J.T. Antonio, and S.E.K. Loh. Mr. Aaron Kitcher who was the Regional Education Officer then and Lawyer Narter Olaga contributed immensely in the pioneering days of the college.

In 1974, the college replaced teacher trainees and started admitting students for vocational and secondary courses.

There are four halls serving the residential needs of the students: these are Same Hall, Lorlorvor Hall, Songor Hall and Okor Hall. The college has ICT facilities. A Library, Science block and had a lot of classroom blocks constructed.

Education 
The college started as a four-year post middle institution. Since then, it has gone through the following programmes:

 2-year Modular course for untrained teachers from 1985 to 1991
 3-year post secondary
 3-year Diploma in Basic Education which started in 2004
 2-year sandwich course for Certificate ‘A’ teachers for the award of Diploma in Basic Education.

The college has six departments and offers various programmes.

Departments 

 Vocational Skills
 Languages
 Science
 Education Studies
 Mathematics & ICT
 Social Sciences

Programmes offered 

 General Specialisation in Primary and Junior High School
 Early Childhood Education Studies
 Mathematics/Science
 French
 Technical & Vocational
 Visually and Hearing Challenged

References 

 

Colleges of Education in Ghana
Greater Accra Region
Educational institutions established in 1965
1965 establishments in Ghana